Amy Harris (born 7 October 1980) is a track and field sprinter from Australia.

She competed in the 2003 World Championships in Athletics – Women's 4 x 100 metres relay, in which the team was placed 6th in heat 2, and in the 2002–03 Australian Athletics Championships 100 metres, in which she won bronze.

References

1980 births
Living people
Australian female sprinters
Place of birth missing (living people)
21st-century Australian women